Checkmate is a 1990 video game published by Interplay Entertainment (also published by Oxford Softworks as Chess Champion 2175).

Gameplay
Checkmate is a game in which the program learns from experience, adapting to the style of a player.

The computer adds moves and situations to its library, allowing the artificial intelligence to learn and improve.

Reception
Jay Kee reviewed the game for Computer Gaming World, and stated that "Just another chess program? Is the Taj Mahal just another building? Is Bo Jackson just another ball player? No. They are all outstanding."

Judith Kilbury-Cobb for .info rated the game three stars and said that "If you've never played chess before, or even if you consider yourself an expert, check out Checkmate."

Ben Mitchell for ACE gave the game a rating of 700 and stated that "Unless you are a connoisseur of chess games or have beaten your old chess program then it is probably not worth upgrading to Chess Champion 2175.

InCider said "If you've ever wondered how a computer plays chess, you can watch Checkmate as it asks 'what if?' of hundreds of possible moves."

Cameron Crotty for Electronic Entertainment said that "CheckMate features much stronger game play – enough to keep even advanced club players hopping. The bare-bones interface lets you control the computer's style of play, and you can even tell your Mac to play a particular line from its large opening library."

References

1990 video games
Amiga games
Atari ST games
Chess software
Classic Mac OS games
DOS games
Video games developed in the United Kingdom